Lee Gae-ho (born 23 June 1959) is a South Korean politician who previously served as Minister of Agriculture, Food and Rural Affairs under President Moon Jae-in. He is also a three-term parliamentarian representing a district previously held by former Prime Minister Lee Nak-yeon.

After passing the state exam in 1980 and before running for by-election in 2014, he has spent most of his career at South Jeolla (Jeonnam) Province government.

In the 2020 general election, his victory was the first out of 253 constituencies to be confirmed by the electoral commission. In 2020 he was elected as the chair of National Assembly's Agriculture, Food, Rural Affairs, Oceans and Fisheries Committee responsible for scrutinising Ministry of Agriculture, Food and Rural Affairs, Ministry of Oceans and Fisheries and related agencies.

He holds a bachelor's degree in management from Chonnam National University.

On 15 April 2021, Lee was tested positive for COVID-19. He became the 1st incumbent MP tested positive for COVID-19.

Electoral history

Awards 
  Order of Service Merit by the government of South Korea (2003)

References 

1959 births
Living people
Agriculture ministers
Minjoo Party of Korea politicians
Members of the National Assembly (South Korea)
Government ministers of South Korea
People from Damyang County
Chonnam National University alumni